The 2016–17 Louisville Cardinals men's basketball team represented the University of Louisville during the 2016–17 NCAA Division I men's basketball season. The Cardinals competed in the Atlantic Coast Conference and were coached by Rick Pitino, in his 16th and final season at Louisville. The team played its home games on Denny Crum Court at the KFC Yum! Center in downtown Louisville. They finished the season 25–9, 12–6 in ACC play to finish in a three-way tie for second place. They lost to Duke in the quarterfinals of the ACC tournament. They received an at-large bid to the NCAA tournament where they defeated Jacksonville State in the first round to advance to the second round where they lost to Michigan.

Previous season
The Cardinals finished the 2015–16 season with a record of 23–8, 12–6 in ACC play to finish in fourth place.

The University of Louisville self-imposed a postseason ban for the 2015–16 season amid an ongoing NCAA investigation over an escort sex scandal involving recruits between 2010 and 2014. None of the players on this team were involved in the allegations. The ban included both the ACC tournament and the NCAA tournament.

Departures

Incoming transfers

Class of 2016 signees

Class of 2017 recruits

Roster

Schedule and results

|-
!colspan=12 style=| Exhibition

|-
!colspan=12 style=| Regular season

|-
!colspan=9 style="|ACC Tournament

|-
!colspan=9 style="|NCAA tournament

Rankings

*AP does not release post-NCAA Tournament rankings

References

Louisville
Louisville Cardinals men's basketball seasons
Louisville Cardinals men's basketball, 2016-17
Louisville Cardinals men's basketball, 2016-17
Louisville